John Madden was Dean of Kilmore from 1734 to 1751.

He was a Fellow of Trinity College, Dublin, Vicar of St Ann, Dublin and died on 7 November 1751.

References

Irish Anglicans
Fellows of Trinity College Dublin
Deans of Kilmore
1751 deaths
Year of birth missing